Francis A. Madden (October 2, 1892 – April 30, 1952) was a Major League Baseball catcher who played in two games for the Pittsburgh Rebels in . Nicknamed "Red", he collected one hit in two at bats, with one run batted in in his game career.

External links

1892 births
1952 deaths
Major League Baseball catchers
Pittsburgh Rebels players
Baseball players from Pennsylvania
Newark Newks players
Marion Orphans players
Ironton Diggers players